Martin Lill (born April 23, 1972 in Tallinn) is an Estonian curler and curling coach.

At the national level, he is a seven-time Estonian men's champion curler (2005, 2007, 2012, 2013, 2014, 2015, 2016), a four-time Estonian mixed champion curler (2005, 2006, 2007, 2016) and a four-time Estonian mixed doubles champion curler (2008, 2009, 2011, 2012).

Teams

Men's

Mixed

Mixed doubles

Record as a coach of national teams

References

External links

Martin Lill - Teemalehed - DELFI

Living people
1972 births
Sportspeople from Tallinn
Estonian male curlers
Estonian curling champions
Estonian curling coaches